The Coupe du Congo is the top knockout tournament of the Congolese football. It was created in 1974.

Winners
List of winners:

References

Football competitions in the Republic of the Congo
National association football cups